Alun Radcliffe Davies (6 May 1923 – 8 June 2003) was a Welsh Anglican priest in the last third of the twentieth century.

Davies was born on 6 May 1923 into an ecclesiastical family: his father was the Revd Canon Rhys Hughes Davies. He was educated at Cowbridge Grammar School, University College, Cardiff, Keble College, Oxford and St. Michael's College, Llandaff. After a curacy in Roath he was a Lecturer at St. Michael's College, Llandaff then Domestic Chaplain to  the Archbishop of Wales. He was a Chaplain in the RNR until 1960 when he became Vicar of Ystrad Mynach. He was Chancellor of Llandaff Cathedral from 1969 to 1971; Archdeacon of Llandaff from 1971 to 1977; a Residentiary Canon of Llandaff Cathedral from 1975 to 1977; Dean of Llandaff from 1977 to 1993; and Chaplain to the Lord Lieutenant of South Glamorgan from 1994 until his death on 8 June 2003.

He had two sons and a daughter with his wife Winifred who died in 1999.

References

1923 births
People from Cowbridge
People educated at Cowbridge Grammar School
Alumni of St Michael's College, Llandaff
Alumni of Cardiff University
Alumni of Keble College, Oxford
Alumni of the University of Wales
Archdeacons of Llandaff
Deans of Llandaff
2003 deaths